Paradise Island is the third studio album by Lake, released in 1979.

Track listing
All tracks written by Detlef Petersen and James Hopkins-Harrison except as indicated

Side One
 "Into the Night" - 5:10
 "Glad to Be Here" (James Hopkins-Harrison, Geoffrey Peacey) - 3:49
 "Crystal Eyes"- 3:58
 "Paradise Way" - 4:53

Side Two
 "Hopeless Love" - 4:03
 "One Way Song" (James Hopkins-Harrison, Alex Conti) - 3:46
 "Hard Road" (James Hopkins-Harrison, Geoffrey Peacey, Alex Conti, Dieter Ahrendt) - 3:40
 "The Final Curtain" - 5:10

The CD release of the album is a "two albums on one CD" release, combined with their first album Lake.

Personnel
Lake
James Hopkins-Harrison - lead and backing vocals
Alex Conti - guitar, vocals
Detlef Petersen - keyboards, vocals
Geoffrey Peacey - keyboards, vocals, guitar
Martin Tiefensee - bass guitar
Dieter Ahrendt - drums, percussion

Produced by Detlef Petersen and Lake
Engineered by Geoffrey Peacey and Gero von Gerlach
Recorded and mixed at Russl Studios, Hamburg
Otto Waalkes played congas on "Into the Night"
Cover illustration by James McMullan
Back cover by Benno Friedman
Design by Paula Scher

LP: Columbia Records JC 35817
CD: Renaissance RMED0123

1979 albums
Columbia Records albums